Larry Ray may refer to:

 Larry Ray, a former baseball right fielder
 Larry Ray (cult leader), born Lawrence Grecco, cult leader at Sarah Lawrence College, New York, 2010s
 Larry Ray (musician), Outrageous Cherry guitarist
 Larry Ray (softball), Florida Gators softball coach

Human names